The following is a list of the prominent caves formed in the islands of the Azores:

Corvo

 Gruta da Ponta do Marco

Faial

 Furna das Cabras
 Furna Ruim
 Gruta da Rua do Algar
 Gruta das Anelares
 Gruta do Cabeço do Canto
 Gruta do Cruzeiro
 Gruta do Luís Pereira
 Gruta do Parque do Capelo
 Gruta dos Covões

Flores

 Furna Jorge
 Gruta do Galo 
 Gruta dos Enxaréus

Graciosa

 Caldeirinha de Pêro Botelho
 Furna d' Água
 Furna da Labarda
 Furna da Lembradeira
 Furna da Maria Encantada
 Furna da Urze
 Furna da Vizinha
 Furna de Manuel de Ávila
 Furna do Abel ou de Lavar
 Furna do Anel
 Furna do Calcinhas
 Furna do Canto
 Furna do Cão
 Furna do Cardo
 Furna do Cavalo
 Furna do Dragoeiro
 Furna do Enxofre
 Furna do Gato
 Furna do Linheiro
 Furna do Luís
 Furna do Moinho
 Furna do Queimado
 Furna do Vermelho
 Furna dos Bolos
 Furna Furada
 Galeria do Forninho
 Gruta de São José
 Gruta do Bom Jesus
 Gruta do Manhengo

Pico

 Algar da Bagacina
 Algar da Furna do Abrigo
 Algar das Hortelãs
 Algar do Cabeço da Negra
 Algar do Cabeço da Serreta
 Algar do Cabeço do Dório de Baixo
 Algar do Cabeço do Dório de Cima
 Algar do Caixeiro
 Algar do Caralhoto da Montanha
 Algar do Chicharro
 Algar do Lanchão
 Algar do Tambor
 Algar do Tamusgo
 Algar dos Burros
 Algar dos Caralhotos
 Algar dos Terreiros
 Algar dos Túneis
 Algar/Gruta das Silvas
 Algar/Gruta do Alto do Morais
 Algar/Gruta do Cabeço Bravo
 Algar/Gruta do Canto da Serra 
 Algar/Gruta do Cogumelo
 Algar José da Silva
 Algares do Miradouro
 Fenda dos Frisos
 Furna da Água
 Furna da Baliza
 Furna da Laje
 Furna da Miragaia
 Furna da Prainha do Galeão
 Furna da Queimada
 Furna da Sapateira
 Furna das Barbeiras
 Furna das Cabras (mar) I
 Furna das Casas
 Furna das Casas Velhas
 Furna das Pombas
 Furna de Henrique Maciel
 Furna do Carregadouro
 Furna do Frei Matias
 Furna do Frei Matias Troço II
 Furna do Frei Matias Troço III
 Furna do Frei Matias Troço IV
 Furna do Lemos
 Furna do Manuel José de Lima
 Furna do Outeiro
 Furna do Tirana
 Furna do Zé Capote
 Furna dos Frades
 Furna dos Mendonças
 Furna dos Vimes
 Furna Nova I
 Furna Nova II
 Furna Vermelha
 Gruta da Agostinha
 Gruta da Baixa da Ribeirinha
 Gruta da Barca (Candelária)
 Gruta da Barca (Madalena)
 Gruta da Canada da Prainha
 Gruta da Cisterna
 Gruta da Estrada Longitudinal I
 Gruta da Estrada Longitudinal II
 Gruta da Pia
 Gruta da Ponte
 Gruta da Ribeira do Fundo 
 Gruta da Ribeira dos Bodes
 Gruta da Ribeirinha
 Gruta da Tia Adelaide
 Gruta da Transversal
 Gruta da Travessa do Queimado
 Gruta das Almas
 Furna das Cabras (terra) II 
 Gruta das Canárias
 Gruta das Cascatas
 Gruta das Laranjeiras
 Gruta das Pombas
 Gruta das Teias
 Gruta das Torres
 Gruta de São Mateus
 Gruta Detrás do Cabeço
 Gruta do Altinho
 Gruta do Aniceto Mateus
 Gruta do Cabeço Bravo
 Gruta do Cabeço da Negra
 Gruta do Cabeço
 Gruta do Cabeço do Carvalhal
 Gruta do Caminho da Montanha
 Gruta do Caminho do Mato
 Gruta do Canto
 Gruta do Cão 
 Gruta do Capitão
 Gruta do Capitão-Mor
 Gruta do Carregadouro II
 Gruta do Cerrado
 Gruta do Dório
 Gruta do Esqueleto
 Gruta do Frei Matias Oeste I
 Gruta do Frei Matias Oeste II
 Gruta do Frei Matias Oeste III
 Gruta do Furtado
 Gruta do Gabriel
 Gruta do Galeão II
 Gruta do Guindaste
 Gruta do Junçalinho
 Gruta do Lajido do Meio
 Gruta do Mistério da Silveira I
 Gruta do Mistério da Silveira II
 Gruta do Mistério da Silveira III
 Gruta do Poço Novo
 Gruta do Ramal de Santo Amaro
 Gruta do Ruivo
 Gruta do Salazar
 Gruta do Soldão
 Gruta do Sumidouro
 Gruta do Tambor Estrada
 Gruta do Tanquinho
 Gruta do Tubarão
 Gruta do Zé Pereira
 Gruta dos Algares
 Gruta dos Arcos
 Gruta dos Azevinhos
 Gruta dos Bodes
 Gruta dos Cogumelos
 Gruta dos Cortiços
 Gruta dos Montanheiros
 Gruta dos Túmulos
 Gruta Grande do Cabeço Bravo
 Gruta Pequena do Cabeço Bravo
 Gruta Tavares de Melo
 Tubo do Rochedo

Santa Maria

 Furna do Ilhéu do Romeiro
 Furna Velha
 Gruta das Figueiras
 Gruta de Santana

São Jorge

 Algar das Bocas do Fogo
 Algar do Morro Pelado
 Algar do Pico da Maria Pires
 Algar dos Suspiros I
 Algar dos Suspiros II
 Furna da Preguiça
 Furna da Recta da Cruz
 Furna da Vigia I
 Furna da Vigia II
 Furna das Pombas
 Furna do Poio
 Furna do Pombal
 Galeria do Toledo
 Gruta da Beira
 Gruta da Canada do Pedroso
 Gruta da Granja
 Gruta da Lomba do Gato
 Gruta da Ribeira do Almeida
 Gruta da Ribeira Seca
 Gruta das Três Bocas
 Gruta do Cerrado dos Algares
 Gruta do Leão
 Gruta dos Encantados
 Grutas do Algar do Montoso

São Miguel

 Algar da Batalha
 Algar da Ribeirinha
 Algar do Pico Queimado
 Caldeirão
 Fenda do Pico Queimado
 Gruta António Borges
 Gruta da Candelária
 Gruta da Giesta
 Gruta da Lagoa
 Gruta da Manguinha
 Gruta da Nordela
 Gruta da Quinta Irene
 Gruta da Rua do Paim (Carvão II)
 Gruta da Rua João do Rego (Carvão III)
 Gruta da Rua José Bensaúde
 Gruta da Soledade
 Gruta das Arribanas
 Gruta das Escadinhas
 Gruta das Feteiras
 Gruta das Queimadas
 Gruta de Água de Pau
 Gruta de Rabo de Peixe
 Gruta de Santa Clara
 Gruta de São Pedro
 Gruta de Vila Franca
 Gruta do Carvão
 Gruta do Enforcado
 Gruta do Esqueleto
 Gruta do Livramento
 Gruta do Pico da Cruz
 Gruta do Pico do Funcho
 Gruta dos Valados
 Panela da Caloura
 Túnel da Caloura

Terceira

 Algar Adérito de Freitas
 Algar da Canada do Laranjo
 Algar das Furnas
 Algar do Biscoitinho
 Algar do Canadão
 Algar do Carvão
 Algar do Chambre
 Algar do Funil
 Algar do João Caldo Quente
 Algar do Juncal
 Algar do Negro
 Algar do Pico Alto
 Algar do Pico do Funil
 Algar do Pico Gaspar I
 Algar do Pico Gaspar II
 Algar dos Funis
 Algar/Gruta do Mistério
 Algar/Gruta do Pico das Dez
 Cova do Caldeirão (Sé)
 Cova do Caldeirão (Serreta)
 Fenda do Pico Zimbreiro
 Furna da Bugia
 Furna da Nascente
 Furna da Rua Longa
 Furna das Feiticeiras
 Furna das Pombas
 Furna d' Água 
 Furna de Santa Maria
 Furna do Cabrito
 Furna do Frade
 Furna do Poço Negro
 Furna do Portão
 Furna dos Ninhos
 Galeria da Queimada
 Galeria da Ribeira Seca
 Galeria do Fanal
 Galeria do Felisberto Joaquim
 Galeria do Sequeira
 Galerias da Feteira 
 Gruta Brisa Azul 
 Gruta da Achada
 Gruta da Baía de Vila Maria
 Gruta da Branca Opala
 Gruta da Canada do Laranjo
 Gruta da Cascata
 Gruta da Chamusca
 Gruta da Madre de Deus 
 Gruta da Malha
 Gruta da Malha Grande
 Gruta da Santinha
 Gruta da Terra Mole
 Gruta das Agulhas 
 Gruta das Cinco Ribeiras 
 Gruta das Laranjas
 Gruta das Mercês I
 Gruta das Mercês II 
 Gruta de Santa Catarina
 Gruta de Santo António
 Gruta do Alicerce
 Gruta do Baldio
 Gruta do Caldeira 
 Gruta do Camarão
 Gruta do Camelo
 Gruta do Cerro I
 Gruta do Cerro II
 Gruta do Cerro III
 Gruta do Chocolate
 Gruta do Coelho
 Gruta do Esqueleto
 Gruta do Golfe
 Gruta do Natal 
 Gruta do Pico do Funil
 Gruta do Tanque
 Gruta do Zé Grande I 
 Gruta do Zé Grande II 
 Gruta dos Balcões 
 Gruta dos Buracos
 Gruta dos Morros da Azenha
 Gruta dos Principiantes 
 Gruta dos Ratões
 Gruta dos Ratos
 Gruta Pequena
 Tubo I do Monte Brasil
 Tubo II do Monte Brasil

External links
Speleoazores.com
 Lista das Cavidades vulcânicas dos Açores 
Montanheiros.com

References
 
 
 
 
 
 

caves
Caves of Portugal
caves
Azores